Ian Adams (July 22, 1937 — November 7, 2021) was a Canadian author of fiction and non-fiction novels, television, and movies. Originally a journalist, he is now best known for his writing: his most successful novels are S – Portrait of a Spy and Agent of Influence.

Childhood
Ian Adams was born in what is now Tanzania to a Lillian and Richard Adams, Irish lay missionaries administering a medical clinic in the former Belgian Congo. According to family lore, a pregnant Lillian singlehandedly canoed across a narrow stretch of Lake Tanganyika so that Adams would be born in what was then the British colony of Tanganyika rather than in the Belgian colony his parents were working in.  He grew up in Central and East Africa. During World War II, both of Adams's parents joined the British Army, his mother as an ambulance driver and his father as an engineer, while three-year old Ian was sent to boarding school. Adams resented his parents for abandoning him at a young age and while the entire family moved to North America, Adams did so separately as a teenager and lived on his own in Winnipeg where he attended the University of Manitoba, studying fine arts.

Career

Journalism
Though an accomplished painter, Adams pursued a  career initially as a photojournalist and reporter. As an award-winning investigative journalist, he worked for five years at Maclean's, Canada's national news magazine, covering many national stories including "The Lonely Death of Charlie Wenjack" (Volume 80, February 1967), reprinted under the title "Why did Charlie Wenjack Die?" in The Poverty Wall in 1970. Charlie Wenjack was an Indigenous Canadian child who ran away from a residential school in northern Ontario in an attempt to reach his father, 650 kilometres away. The child was found beside a CNR track, poorly dressed and dead of hunger and cold. In the Maclean's article, he wrote: "Under the heading The Lonely Death of Charlie Wenjack, he wrote, “It’s not so unusual that Indian children run away from the residential schools they are sent to. They do it all the time, and they lose their fingers and toes to frostbite. Sometimes they lose a leg or an arm trying to climb aboard freight trains. Occasionally, one of them dies. And perhaps because they are Indians, no one seems to care very much. So this, then, is the story of how a little boy met a terrible and lonely death, of the handful of people who became involved, and of a town that hardly noticed.” The story resulted in a series of complaints to the magazine by readers, including the CEO of the magazine's publisher, Maclean-Hunter, who wrote Adams telling him he didn't think that sort of writing belonged in the magazine. Adams quit the publication and pursued a freelance career. In September 2012 Adams was interviewed about the Charlie Wenjack story as part of the CBC documentary "Dying For An Education". Gord Downie, lead singer of the Canadian band The Tragically Hip, cited Adams' Maclean's article as the source for his  work, "Secret Path".

Adams' international stories included coverage of the Vietnam War and the coup d'état that overthrew Allende in Chile, for publications such as the Globe and Mail.

Literature
During the 1970s and 1980s Adams lived, worked and traveled extensively in South and Central America, mostly covering the so-called "dirty wars". From this period came the novel Becoming Tania (published by McClelland and Stewart), the love story of Che Guevara and his compañera Tania who was killed with Che in the Bolivian jungle. Adams' screenplay adaptation, Tango Duro, was nominated in 2005 for the Writers Guild of Canada's Best Unproduced Screenplay: the Jim Burt Prize.

His 1977 novel, S – Portrait of a Spy, led to a libel suit in which a former RCMP Security Service officer Leslie James Bennett claimed the central character, a Soviet mole who penetrated the RCMP, was modelled after him. The publisher stopped distribution of the book despite the fact that 12,000 copies had already been sold and a deal to turn the book into a movie was cancelled as a result. The case was settled out of court with Adams paying Bennett $30,000 and agreeing to add a disclaimer to the book. The novel was adapted into a play, in 1984 by Adams and Rick Salutin.

Film adaptations
Ian Adams and his writing partner and son, Riley Adams, have turned several of his seven published novels into movies. S – Portrait of a Spy, was scheduled for production as a feature film (by Alberta Filmworks) in the spring of 2006.

The Adams team with Riley as the lead writer has also written the original screenplays for two of the seven MOWs in this fall's CTV lineup. , (GalaFilms) starring William Hurt, John Corbett, and Wendy Crewson; the second original screen play, The Clark Todd Story, (ImagiNation Films and Box Films, UK) was scheduled for  filming to begin early in 2006.

His 1999 novel, Agent of Influence, based on the true story of Canadian diplomat John Watkins who died while under Royal Canadian Mounted Police interrogation, was adapted by the Adams team, and aired on the national CTV network in 2003–2004. Produced  by Alberta FilmWorks and Gala Films, Agent of Influence starred Christopher Plummer. The film has been sold by Alliance-Atlantis to TV networks in 132 countries, and in 2003 was recognized by the European Screenplay Writers' association as the best foreign television screenplay.

The Adams partnership created the screenplay for the full-length feature, Bad Faith, adapted from Ian Adams' novel of the same title  and filmed in Calgary and Montreal during March 2000 by Alberta FilmWorks — is now distributed worldwide by Oasis under the title, Cold Blooded.

Ian Adams has also written many hours of produced television for Canadian and U.S. shows.

Bibliography

Novels
The Trudeau Papers (1971) 
S: Portrait of a Spy (1977)
Endgame in Paris (1979)
Bad Faith (1983) 
Becoming Tania (1990)
Agent of Influence (1999)

Nonfiction
The Poverty Wall (1970) (includes "Why Did Charlie Wenjack Die?")  
The Real Poverty Report (1971)
Power of the Wheel - The Falun Gong Revolution (1999)

Plays
S: Portrait of a Spy (with Rick Salutin) (1984)

Awards
Adams' work Agent of Influence has received the following awards:
Best Foreign Television Screenplay Award — given by the Les 16e Rencontres Internationales de Télévision: The Euro International Film and Television Festival  held March 16–23, 2003 in Reims, France.
Nominated for best screenplay in the Writers' Guild of Canada's 2004 MOW category.
Nominated for best screenplay 2003 Geminis.  Agent of Influence garnered five other Gemini nominations and one Gemini — Ted Whitall best supporting actor.
Awarded a HUGOS "Certificate of Merit" in the Feature-Length Telefilm Drama category at the Chicago International Television Awards, March 2003.

References

1937 births
2021 deaths
Canadian male novelists
Canadian people of Anglo-Irish descent
Writers from Toronto
Maclean's writers and editors
20th-century Canadian novelists
Canadian investigative journalists
20th-century Canadian male writers
Canadian male non-fiction writers
Canadian male screenwriters
Canadian male dramatists and playwrights
Tanganyika (territory) people
British emigrants to Canada
Canadian photojournalists